Hetty Rock is the largest of several rocks in Walker Bay off John Beach in western Livingston Island in the South Shetland Islands, Antarctica.  The area was visited by early 19th century sealers.

The feature is named after the British sealing ship Hetty under Captain Ralph Bond that operated in the South Shetlands in 1820–21.

Location

See also 
 Composite Antarctic Gazetteer
 List of Antarctic islands south of 60° S
 SCAR
 Territorial claims in Antarctica

Maps
 L.L. Ivanov et al. Antarctica: Livingston Island and Greenwich Island, South Shetland Islands. Scale 1:100000 topographic map. Sofia: Antarctic Place-names Commission of Bulgaria, 2005.
 L.L. Ivanov. Antarctica: Livingston Island and Greenwich, Robert, Snow and Smith Islands. Scale 1:120000 topographic map.  Troyan: Manfred Wörner Foundation, 2009.

References

External links
Composite Antarctic Gazetteer.

Rock formations of Livingston Island